Glenn Peter Strömberg (born 5 January 1960) is a Swedish former professional footballer who played as a midfielder. Starting his career in 1979 with IFK Göteborg, he helped the club win the 1981–82 UEFA Cup before signing with Benfica in 1983. In 1984, he joined the Serie A club Atalanta for which he served as the team captain for four seasons until his retirement in 1992. A full international between 1982 and 1990, he won 52 caps and scored 7 goals for the Sweden national team, and represented his country at the 1990 FIFA World Cup. He was awarded Guldbollen in 1985 as Sweden's best footballer of the year.

Club career

IFK Göteborg 
Strömberg was a part of IFK Göteborg's youth teams before making his senior debut for "Änglarna" on 16 April 1979 in an Allsvenskan game against Kalmar FF that ended 4–0. He helped the team win the 1981–82 UEFA Cup, the 1982 Allsvenskan, as well as three Svenska Cupen titles between 1979 and 1983. During Strömberg's four seasons at Göteborg, he played in 203 games (including friendlies) and scored 33 goals.

Benfica 
Strömberg signed with Benfica after the 1982 Allsvenskan season, reuniting with his former IFK Göteborg manager Sven-Göran Eriksson. During only one and a half seasons at Benfica, Strömberg helped the team win two straight Portuguese league championships.

Atalanta 
After scoring three goals for Sweden against Italy during the UEFA Euro 1984 qualifying stage against Italy, Strömberg managed to land a contract in Serie A with Atalanta. While at Atalanta, he was voted Swedish footballer of the year, winning the 1985 Guldbollen.

International career 
Strömberg appeared 9 times for the Sweden U21 team between 1979 and 1981. He made his senior international debut for Sweden on 3 June 1982 in a friendly 1-1 draw with the Soviet Union, playing for 68 minutes before being replaced by Karl Gunnar Björklund. Strömberg scored his first international goal on 29 May 1983 in a UEFA Euro 1984 qualifying game against Italy which Sweden won 2–0. A few months later, Strömberg scored two goals as Sweden beat Italy 3–0 away in the same qualifying campaign. Despite the two victories against Italy, Sweden failed to qualify for UEFA Euro 1984.

Strömberg was a part of the Sweden team that qualified for the 1990 FIFA World Cup, and scored a goal against Scotland as Sweden was eliminated in the group stage after three straight losses. Strömberg's last international appearance came in the last group stage game against Costa Rica on 20 June 1990.

Playing style 
For his majestic way of playing in the midfield Strömberg was nicknamed "The Marathon Man". His usual position was central midfield or defensive midfield.

Personal life 
Strömberg works as an expert commentator for Sveriges Television, for Viasat on UEFA Champions League and F.A. Premier League matches and for sports betting site Expekt.com as an expert. In June 2012, Glenn Strömberg launched his own football site, Gurufans.com, in Swedish and English.

Since he has no managerial experience, he was never regarded as a serious candidate to succeed Lars Lagerbäck as head coach of the Sweden national football team. In interviews during the 2006 FIFA World Cup he said that he was flattered to get mentioned as a potential candidate for the job and that he would think carefully about any offer from the Swedish Football Association.

Career statistics

International 
Appearances and goals by national team and year

International goals

Honours
IFK Göteborg

 UEFA Cup: 1981–82
 Allsvenskan: 1982
Svenska Cupen: 1978–79, 1981–82, 1982–83
Benfica
Primeira Liga: 1982–83, 1983–84
Supertaça Cândido de Oliveira runner-up: 1983
Iberian Cup: 1983
Atalanta
Coppa Italia runner-up: 1986–87
Individual
Guldbollen: 1985
Orders
  Officer of the Order of the Star of Italy (2 May 2012)

References

External links

1960 births
Living people
Footballers from Gothenburg
Expatriate footballers in Portugal
Expatriate footballers in Italy
Swedish footballers
Sweden international footballers
Sweden under-21 international footballers
Swedish expatriate footballers
Swedish expatriate sportspeople in Portugal
IFK Göteborg players
S.L. Benfica footballers
Atalanta B.C. players
Allsvenskan players
Serie A players
Serie B players
Primeira Liga players
1990 FIFA World Cup players
Association football midfielders
Swedish association football commentators
UEFA Cup winning players